Frances Finch, Countess of Winchilsea and Nottingham (c.1690 – September 1734), was an English aristocrat and social reformer.

Biography
She was the daughter of Basil Feilding, 4th Earl of Denbigh, and his wife, the former Hester Firebrace, and was the sister of the 5th Earl. She married Daniel Finch, 8th Earl of Winchilsea in December 1729. They had one daughter, Charlotte, born in 1731.

Few details of her life are known; however, she was notable in being one of the aristocratic women who were early supporters of Thomas Coram's efforts to establish a Foundling Hospital. She signed the Ladies' Petition which was delivered to King George II to support the establishment of the Hospital on 25 April 1730, and she is the signatory of whom least is known. This group of women not only lent their prestige and respectability to the endeavour, they made it 'one of the most fashionable charities of the day'. As part of an exhibition celebrating the role of women in the establishment and administration of the Hospital, called Ladies of Quality and Distinction, the Foundling Museum held an exhibition in 2018 which included a family portrait of Francis.

Through her marriage she was the aunt of another signatory, Selina Hastings, Countess of Huntingdon.

The cause of her death is not known. She is buried at her husband's family seat of Ravenstone, Buckinghamshire.

References 

British social reformers
Winchilsea
Daughters of British earls
Daughters of Irish earls
1734 deaths
English philanthropists
1690 births
English women philanthropists
18th-century philanthropists